There are over 20,000 Grade II* listed buildings in England.  This page is a list of these buildings in Blaby.

Blaby

|}

Notes

External links

 Blaby
listed buildings
Blaby